William Stevenson may refer to:

Government and politics
 Sir William Stevenson (colonial administrator) (1805–1863), Governor of Mauritius
 William E. Stevenson (1820–1883), American politician, Governor of West Virginia
 William Ernest Stevenson (born 1870s), Northern Irish Senator
 William Francis Stevenson (1861–1942), U.S. Congressman from South Carolina
 William H. Stevenson (1891–1978), U.S. Congressman from Wisconsin
 William Stevenson (judge) (1934–2021), Canadian Supreme Court justice
 William Stevenson (New Zealand politician, born 1901) (1901–1983), New Zealand industrialist and philanthropist
 William Stevenson (New Zealand politician, born 1864) (1864–1935), member of the New Zealand Legislative Council

Other
 Sir William Stevenson (poet) (1530–1575), English poet
 William Stevenson (publisher) (1741–1821), English publisher and author
 William Stevenson (Scottish writer) (1772–1829), Scottish nonconformist preacher and writer; father of Elizabeth Gaskell
 William Bennet Stevenson (c. 1787 – after 1830), British explorerWilliam Bennet Stevenson 
 William Stevenson (minister) (1805–1873), Scottish minister and antiquarian
 William Ford Stevenson (1811–1852), Fellow of the Royal Society
 William Grant Stevenson (1849–1919), Scottish sculptor and painter
 William Stevenson (bishop) (1878–1945), Australian Anglican bishop
 William Stevenson (athlete) (1900–1985), U.S. Olympic athlete, lawyer, and ambassador
 William Stevenson (canoeist) (born 1923–1992), Canadian canoeist
 William Stevenson (Canadian writer) (1924–2013), British-born Canadian author and journalist
 William "Mickey" Stevenson (born 1937), Motown songwriter and record producer
 Willie Stevenson (born 1939), footballer
 Willie Stevenson (baseball), American baseball player

See also 
 Bill Stevenson (disambiguation)
 William Stephenson (disambiguation)